Specioza Kimera Ndagire, is a Ugandan businesswoman, and corporate executive, who works as the managing director of Uganda Energy Credit Capitalisation Company (UECCC), a Uganda government parastatal company that coordinates funding from the Ugandan government, international development partners and the private sector, for investment in renewable energy infrastructure in Uganda.

Career
In March 2014, she was appointed as managing director and chief executive officer of UECCC, the first person and the first woman to serve in that capacity. The company works with the private sector to identify, survey, attract and source funding for and develop renewable energy power sources in Uganda. In addition, UECCC informs and educates Ugandan businesses, including small and medium-sized enterprises (SME’s) on how to sustainably utilize the electricity that they consume.

Prior to her appointment as CEO, Ms. Ndagire worked as the company's General Manager, for five years from 2009 when the company was established, until 2014, when she was confirmed as the chief executive. The focus is to promote investment in the solar sector.

References

External links
Website of Uganda Energy Credit Capitalisation Company (UECCC) 
Government duped in Shs150 trillion investment deal As of 16 August 2017.

Living people
Year of birth missing (living people)
Ganda people
21st-century Ugandan businesswomen
21st-century Ugandan businesspeople
Ugandan women business executives
People from Central Region, Uganda
Ugandan women chief executives